USS George M. Neal (DDG-131) is a planned  guided missile destroyer of the United States Navy, the 81st overall for the class. She will be named in honor of Aviation Machinist’s Mate 3rd Class George M. Neal, a Korean War veteran and prisoner of war, who was a recipient of the Navy Cross. George M. Neal will be the sixth ship of the Flight III series.

References

 

Arleigh Burke-class destroyers
Proposed ships of the United States Navy